Shume is a town in Tanzania in the Usambara Mountains in Lushoto District of Tanga Region . It was formerly known as New Hornow and was the location of a sawmill during the country's colonial period. Around 1910, a cable railway was constructed to link the mill with the Usambara line to permit export to Germany.

References

Villages in Tanzania